Rennison is a surname. Notable people with the surname include:

Colleen Rennison (born 1987), Canadian singer-songwriter and actress
David Rennison, British Royal Air Force air vice marshal
Graham Rennison (born 1978), English footballer
Louise Rennison (1951–2016), English writer and comedian
Richard Rennison (1889–1969), Scottish "anvil priest"